Sotina is a village in the Municipality of Rogašovci in the Prekmurje region of northeastern Slovenia. The village includes the following hamlets: Bezovkova Graba, Maribor (a small Roma settlement), Bracov Dol, Činčov Breg, Kolarova Graba, Majcov Mlin, Martinova Graba, Patrov Breg, Tomanov Breg, and Turzov Breg.

References

External links
Sotina on Geopedia

Populated places in the Municipality of Rogašovci